Boris is a surname. Notable people with the surname include:

Jean-Pierre Boris, journalist at Radio France Internationale
Paul Boris (born 1955), American baseball player
Trevor Boris (born 1980), Canadian comedian, writer, and television producer